Benu Malla was the 3rd king of Bagdi Malla dynasty of Bishnupur. He ruled from 720 - 733 CE. His father was Jay Malla (710 - 720 CE). After Benu Malla, his son Kinu Malla became the king of Malla dynasty and he ruled from 733 - 742 CE.

Sources
 

Malla rulers of the Bankura